Hugo Largo was an American musical group formed in 1984, known for their unique lineup: two bass guitars, a violin and singer/performance artist Mimi Goese. Their sound has been characterized as art rock, dream pop, ambient and avant-rock.

History
Hugo Largo formed in 1984, initially as a trio featuring vocalist Goese and bassists Tim Sommer (a WNYU DJ, journalist for Trouser Press and The Village Voice, and former member of Even Worse and Swans) and Greg Letson (who Sommer had met while they played together in the Glenn Branca Ensemble). In January 1981, Letson left, and was replaced by Adam Peacock. Shortly thereafter, they were joined on violin by Hahn Rowe, who had been engineering their live sound. 

In February 1987, they released the Michael Stipe-produced EP Drum on Relativity Records (Stipe also sang backing vocals on two tracks). The EP was reissued in 1988 as a full album with additional material on Brian Eno's label, Opal Records. Their second album, Mettle, was released in 1989, first on Opal, then on All Saints Records (and on Land Records in the United Kingdom). This lineup of the band performed their final shows in July 1989.

In late 1990, Goese, Peacock and Rowe decided to reform the band without founding member Sommer (who had become an MTV veejay), and recruited bassist Bill Stair (ex-Art Objects) via an ad in The Village Voice. This new lineup of Hugo Largo spent several months rehearsing and composing new material before making their debut at a sold-out gig at the Knitting Factory in New York City on April 12, 1991, with Stipe and Mike Mills of R.E.M. - in New York for a taping of Saturday Night Live - in attendance. The reformed lineup played several more shows in New York, but a third album was never recorded (although some demos and live recordings were made). Hugo Largo played their last gig at the Brooklyn Bridge Anchorage on September 5, 1991.

Later projects
Under the name Mimi, Goese released a solo album, Soak, in 1998, and has collaborated with artists like Moby and Ben Neill.

Sommer later played with the New Orleans-based Hi-Fi Sky, who released Music for Synchronized Swimming in Space in 2005.

Discography

Studio albums
Drum (1988, Opal Records)
Mettle (1989, Opal Records/All Saints Records)

Singles and EPs
Drum 12" EP (1987, Relativity Records)
"Turtle Song" 12" single (1989, Land Records)

References

External links 
Unofficial website 

American ambient music groups
American pop music groups
Musical groups established in 1984
All Saints Records artists